I was a Swiss Banker is a 2007 published fantasy film by director Thomas Imbach with Beat Marti in the leading role. The premiere of the film took place on 12 February 2007 during the Berlin International Film Festival.

Plot 
The successful young Swiss banker Roger Caviezel has been smuggling the black money of his German customers across the border for some time. When he is stopped in his vehicle at a border control, he flees into Lake Constance with his wallet - as the police are chasing him. This lake, however, is populated by mystical beings. The banker bets with a witch that he can find his true love in a maximum of three attempts. When his flirtations with a shepherdess, a blonde seductress and a waitress fail and he realises that he cannot free himself from the clutches of the pushy witch, he visits his canton Graubünden. Home. There he falls in love with a Turkish employee on his grandmother's farm, which also does not last long. After he was able to parachute to safety from the witch, he is enchanted by another companion, the mermaid in Lara Croft outfit. She becomes his mistress Patricia, with whom Roger finds his new happiness as a lido operator on Lake Geneva.

Cast
 Beat Marti: Roger Caviezel
 Laura Drasbæk: Patricia (mermaid)
 Anne-Grethe Bjarup Riis: Heli (witch)
 Sandra Medina: Laura
 Helena af Sandeberg: Helena
 Mellika Melani: Zahar
 Angelica Biert: Grandmother
 Lale Yavaş: Banu

Background 
The fairy-tale plot is based on The Little Mermaid by Hans Christian Andersen and the female main characters are played by Scandinavian actresses. The film takes a summery stroll through the Swiss landscape, with dreamy underwater shots of lakes and rivers standing out in particular.

Reception 
Lexikon of International Film: „A playful, fairy-tale search for federal identity, developed in refreshingly sensual images, which in a variety of ways sings the praises of equal coexistence."

René Müller, Filmbulletin: „ I Was a Swiss Banker is characterised by a curious mix of genres. A fairy tale that begins like a crime thriller and develops into a frivolous travel and local history film with an international touch.“

Lukas Foerster, Dirty Laundry: „I Was a Swiss Banker is also the best film about Switzerland that I have ever seen. ...Roger is from the very beginning beyond psychologization and family history and serves merely as an always well-coiffed free-floating object, which on the one hand can be claimed by erotic and other accesses and on the other hand can serve as a picture and narration machinery, which is able to produce a postcard panorama and an abstruse subplot one after the other.“

Weblinks

References 

Swiss fantasy films

2007 films
2007 fantasy films
Films about witchcraft
Films based on The Little Mermaid